This is a list of states and union territories of India ranked by incidents of human trafficking as of 2016, and is based on the number of convicted cases. The list is compiled from the '2016 Crime in India Report' published by National Crime Records Bureau (NCRB), Government of India.

According to the report, the top three states with highest number of human trafficking incidents based on number of cases reported are West Bengal, Rajasthan and Gujarat and the top three states with highest number of human trafficking incidents based on crime rates are West Bengal, Daman and Diu and Goa.

States and union territories 

Notes

References

States and union territories of India-related lists
Crime in India by state or union territory
Lists of subdivisions of India
Human trafficking in India